David C. King is an American author, political consultant and senior lecturer at Harvard University. 
He lectures on Legislatures, Political Parties and Interest Groups. Professor King joined the Harvard faculty in 1992.

Professional career
He is currently Lecturer in Public Policy at The Harvard Kennedy School and the Faculty Chair of two programs - 
 Harvard's Program for Newly Elected Members of the U.S. Congress
 Harvard’s executive program for leaders in State and Local Governments.

Harvard Kennedy School
King is the faculty director of Harvard's program for Newly Elected Members of the U.S. Congress which introduces officials to the complex legal and ethical issues involved in holding office. He has run similar programs for the State Duma of the Russian Federation, and he has advised on legislative design issues in several countries, including South Korea, Nicaragua, Chile, and Bolivia. Along with John Della Volpe, founder of SocialSphere and Director of Polling at Harvard Kennedy School's Institute of Politics, King has overseen Harvard's surveys of young peoples' interests in community service and politics.

Publications
King is co-author along with Zachary Karabell of The Generation of Trust: How the U.S. Military has Regained the Public’s Confidence since Vietnam, (The American Enterprise Institute, 2003) 
He is the author of Turf Wars: How Congressional Committees Claim Jurisdiction, (University of Chicago Press, 1997),
and co-editor with Joseph S. Nye and Philip Zelikow on Why People Don’t Trust Government, (Harvard University Press, 1997). Also published in Japanese (Tokyo: Eiji Shuppan, 2002).

References

 http://davidcking.com

American political consultants
Harvard University faculty
Living people
Year of birth missing (living people)